NBA TV Canada is a Canadian English language discretionary specialty channel owned by Maple Leaf Sports & Entertainment (MLSE). It is a Canadian version of NBA TV, broadcasting programming focused on the National Basketball Association, and its Canadian franchise, the Toronto Raptors.

History

In December 2000, MLSE was granted approval by the Canadian Radio-television and Telecommunications Commission (CRTC) for a Category 2 digital specialty channel licence tentatively known as Raptors Basketball Channel, a channel described as being devoted primarily to the Toronto Raptors basketball franchise and the National Basketball Association (NBA), with additional programming related to other aspects of basketball.

The channel was launched on September 7, 2001, as Raptors NBA TV, with programming focused on the NBA and other basketball-related programming, although it maintained a particular emphasis on the Toronto Raptors.  On November 1, 2005, the network launched a high definition simulcast.

On October 15, 2010, the channel was renamed as NBA TV Canada, as the network began to air more programming devoted to the NBA and international basketball in general, sourced from its U.S. counterpart.

The channel was valued at $21 million on behalf of the CRTC in 2012.

Programming
NBA TV Canada broadcasts programming primarily related to the NBA and the Raptors, as well as coverage of other leagues including the NBA G League, Summer League, and the Women's National Basketball Association (WNBA). Regular hosts for local studio programming include David Amber, Sherman Hamilton, Matt Devlin, Leo Rautins and Jack Armstrong. The channel broadcasts NBA games sourced from NBA TV and ESPN, and NBA TV series and studio programs.

NBA TV Canada does not broadcast live Raptors games outside of the pre-season (which are split between the networks of TSN and Sportsnet—which are owned by the co-majority owners of MLSE, Rogers Communications and Bell Canada), but does broadcast full and abbreviated encores of Raptors telecasts.

References

External links
 

Sports television networks in Canada
Maple Leaf Sports & Entertainment
National Basketball Association on television
English-language television stations in Canada
Television channels and stations established in 2001
Digital cable television networks in Canada